Harinakundu is an upazila of Jhenaidah District in the Division of Khulna, Bangladesh.

Geography
It has 27,408 households and total area 227.19 km2.

Demographics
According to the 2011 Bangladesh census, Harinakunda had a population of 197,723. Males constituted 50.21% of the population and females 49.79%. Muslims formed 95.43% of the population, Hindus 4.42%, Christians 0.01% and others 0.14%. Harinakunda had a literacy rate of 42.31% for the population 7 years and above.

As of the 1991 Bangladesh census, Harinakunda has a population of 162,078. Males constitute 51.57% of the population, and females 48.43%. This Upazila's eighteen up population is 79,363. Harinakunda has an average literacy rate of 20.8% (7+ years), and the national average of 32.4% literate.

Administration
Harinakunda Upazila is divided into 1 municipality (Harinakunda) and eight union parishads namely: Bhayna, Chandpur, Daulatpur, Falsi, Joradah, Kapashatia, Raghunathpur, and Taherhuda. The union parishads are subdivided into 77 mauzas and 122 villages.

Harinakunda Municipality is subdivided into 9 wards and 17 mahallas.

Notable people
Abul Hasan Jashori, Islamic scholar and freedom fighter

See also
 Upazilas of Bangladesh
 Districts of Bangladesh
 Divisions of Bangladesh

References

Upazilas of Jhenaidah District
Jhenaidah District
Khulna Division